In Australia, one vote, one value is a democratic principle, applied in electoral laws governing redistributions of electoral divisions of the House of Representatives. The principle calls for all electoral divisions to have the same number of enrolled voters (not residents or population), within a specified percentage of variance. The electoral laws of the Commonwealth for the House of Representatives and all states follow the principle with some exceptions. The principle does not apply to the Senate, as each state is entitled under the constitution to the same number of senators irrespective of the population of the state.

Degree of malapportionment
Currently, for the House of Representatives, the number of enrolled voters in each division in a state or territory can vary by up to 10% from the average quota for the state or territory, and the number of voters can vary by up to 3.5% from the average projected enrolment three-and-a-half years into the future. The allowable quota variation of the number of electors in each division was reduced from 20% to 10% by the Commonwealth Electoral Act (No. 2) 1973, passed at the joint sitting of Parliament in 1974. The change was instigated by the Whitlam Labor government.

However, due to various reasons, such as the minimum number of members for Tasmania, larger seats like Cowper (New South Wales) contain almost double the electors of smaller seats like Solomon (Northern Territory).

While all states (other than Tasmania) historically have had some form of malapportionment, electoral reform in recent decades resulted in an electoral legislation and policy framework based on the "one vote one value" principle. However, in the Western Australian and Queensland Legislative Assemblies, seats covering areas greater than  may be drawn with fewer electors than the general tolerance would allow.

The years that each state got rid of malapportionment and instituted "one vote, one value"

Proposed constitutional amendment
The Whitlam Labor government proposed to amend the Constitution in a referendum in 1974 to require the use of population to determine the size of electorates rather than alternative methods of distributing seats, such as geographical size. The bill was not passed by the Senate and instead the referendum was put to voters using the deadlock provision in Section 128. The referendum was not carried, obtaining a majority in just one State and achieving 47.20% support, an overall minority of 407,398 votes.

In 1988, the Hawke Labor government submitted a referendum proposal to enshrine the principle in the Australian Constitution. The referendum question came about due to the widespread malapportionment and gerrymandering which was endemic during Joh Bjelke-Petersen's term as the Queensland Premier. The proposal was opposed by both the Liberal Party of Australia and the National Party of Australia. The referendum proposal was not carried, obtaining a majority in no States and achieving just 37.6% support, an overall minority of 2,335,741.

See also

 Elections in Australia
 McGinty v Western Australia
 One man, one vote
 Bjelkemander
 Playmander

References

Democracy
Elections in Australia